Jolan Gidney-Craigen (born 12 November 1993), mononymously known as Jolan, is an English singer. He is best known for placing second in the fifth series of The Voice UK.

Early life
Jolan Gidney-Craigen was born on 12 November 1993 in Bolton, England. His mother died in 2014, which convinced him to re-audition for The Voice UK in 2016.

Career

2014–16: The Voice UK
Jolan had previously performed a blind audition in the third series of The Voice UK, singing Labrinth and Emeli Sandé's "Beneath Your Beautiful", but failed to make any of the coaches turn for him and he was therefore eliminated straight away. In 2016, he auditioned again, performing Terence Trent D'Arby's "Wishing Well". Three out of the four coaches – Boy George, Paloma Faith and Ricky Wilson – turned for him and he elected to join Team Ricky. He went on to reach the final where he was defeated by Kevin Simm, who was also on Wilson's team.

2016–: Later career
Following The Voice UK, Jolan announced that he would be continuing his music career and had gone out to find a record label.

References

1993 births
Living people
English pop singers
English soul singers
English male singer-songwriters
People from Bolton
The Voice UK contestants
21st-century English singers
21st-century British male singers